Louis Thomas may refer to:

Louis Thomas (writer)
Louis Thomas, Count of Soissons
Louis Thomas (football manager) for FC Meyrin

Louis Thomas (Maliseet)

See also

Lewis Thomas (disambiguation)